The 1989 Houston Cougars football team, also known as the Houston Cougars, Houston, or UH, represented the University of Houston in the 1989 NCAA Division I-A football season.  It was the 44th year of season play for Houston.  The team was coached by third-year head coach Jack Pardee.  Serving as offensive coordinator was John Jenkins, who succeeded Pardee as head coach following the season.  The team played its games off-campus at the Astrodome, which had recently received upgrades to seat 62,439 spectators.  The Cougars finished the season ranked as No. 14 by the AP Poll.  Houston quarterback Andre Ware won the Heisman Trophy and Davey O'Brien Award following the conclusion of the season.  Under probation by the NCAA from rules violated in prior seasons, Houston was disallowed from participating in a bowl game, television appearances, and the Coaches Poll.

Regular season
Andre Ware became the first black quarterback to win the Heisman Trophy in 1989, along with the Davey O'Brien Award, the latter award given to the most outstanding college quarterback of the year. That year, his junior year, he threw for 4,699 yards, 46 touchdowns, and set 26 NCAA records.  Many of the records were thanks to the innovative use of the run and shoot offense, which his successor, David Klingler, also used to great effect.  The Cougars ended the season ranked the No. 14 team in the nation by the Associated Press. He then declared for the NFL Draft, foregoing his senior year.

Schedule

Roster

Rankings

Game summaries

at UNLV

at Arizona State

Temple

Andre Ware threw for a career-high 7 touchdown passes.

Baylor

Manny Hazard hauled in a school-record 5 touchdown receptions.

at Texas A&M

SMU

Source: Box Score and Game Story

Houston shattered the NCAA record for total offense with 1,021 yards, and set the mark for passing yards with 771. Andre Ware threw for 517 yards and 6 touchdowns while completing 25 of 41 attempts, and did not play in the second half. Backup David Klingler threw for 254 yards and 4 touchdowns in the second half. Paul Smith caught 6 passes for 255 yards and 3 touchdowns. Chuck Weatherspoon rushed 15 times for 207 yards and 3 touchdowns.

at Arkansas

at TCU

Texas

Source: Box Score

Texas Tech

at Rice

Awards and honors

Andre Ware, Heisman Trophy
Andre Ware, Davey O`Brien Award

Team players in the NFL

Note: David Klingler was drafted into the NFL in 1992.

References

Houston
Houston Cougars football seasons
Houston Cougars football